Caroline Frances Burrell, née Benedict (died 20 September 1923) was a prolific author who wrote under the pseudonym Caroline French Benton.

Works

Gala Day Luncheons (1901)
A Little Cook-Book for a Little Girl (1905)
The Mother's Book (1909)
A Little Girl's Cookery Book (with Mary Florence Hodge) (1911)
Easy Meals (1913)
The Fun of Cooking (1915)
The Complete Club Book for Women (1915)
Little Housekeeping Book for a Little Girl (1925)

References

External links

1923 deaths
20th-century American women writers
Pseudonymous women writers
20th-century American non-fiction writers
20th-century pseudonymous writers